The 2015 Central Connecticut Blue Devils football team represented Central Connecticut State University in the 2015 NCAA Division I FCS football season. They were led by second year head coach Pete Rossomando and played their home games at Arute Field. They were a member of the Northeast Conference. They finished the season 4–7, 3–3 in NEC play to finish in a three-way tie for third place.

Schedule

References

Central Connecticut
Central Connecticut Blue Devils football seasons
Central Connecticut Blue Devils football